The Notre Dame Fighting Irish football program is the college football team of the University of Notre Dame, located in South Bend, Indiana. The team competes as an Independent at the NCAA Division I Football Bowl Subdivision level. Notre Dame has produced more All-Americans than any other Football Bowl Subdivision school.  Additionally, seven Fighting Irish football players have won the Heisman Trophy. Notre Dame is one of only two Catholic universities that field a team in the Football Bowl Subdivision, the other being Boston College, and one of a handful of programs independent of a football conference.  The team plays its home games on Notre Dame's campus at Notre Dame Stadium, also known as the "House that Rockne Built", which has a capacity of 80,795.

Key

Coaches

References

Lists of college football head coaches

Football coaches
Indiana sports-related lists